Dean of Llandaff is the title given to the head of the chapter of Llandaff Cathedral, which is located in Llandaff, Cardiff, Wales.  It is not an ancient office – the head of the chapter was historically the Archdeacon who appears in this role in the Liber Landavensis and in the Chapter Acts preserved in the Glamorgan Records Office – but the office of a separate Dean was established by act of parliament in 1843. A century later the Deanery was merged with the Vicarage of Llandaff. The Chapter forfeited its legal rights on Disestablishment in 1920, when the Dean and Chapter as an ecclesiastical corporation was dissolved, under the terms of the Welsh Church Act 1914. There continues, however, to be a Dean and Chapter under the scheme or constitution made under the Constitution of the Church in Wales.

Deans of Llandaff
1840–1843 John Probyn (archdeacon and dean)
1843–1845 William Bruce Knight
1845–1857 William Conybeare
1857–1877 Thomas Williams
1877–1879 Henry Lynch Blosse
1879–1897 Charles Vaughan
1897–1913 William Davey
1913–1926 Charles Edward Thomas Griffith
1926–1929 Frederick Worsley
1929–1931 Garfield Williams (afterwards Dean of Manchester)
1931–1948 David John Jones
1948–1953 Glyn Simon (afterwards Bishop of Swansea and Brecon, 1953, Bishop of Llandaff, 1957, and Archbishop of Wales, 1968)
1954–1968 Eryl Thomas (afterwards Bishop of Monmouth, 1968, and Bishop of Llandaff, 1970)
1968–1971 Gordon Phillips
1971–1977 John Williams
1977–1993 Alun Davies
1993–2000 John Rogers
2000–2012 John Lewis
2013 Janet Henderson (resigned May 2013)
2014–2022 Gerwyn Capon (resigned May 2022)
2022–present Richard Peers

References

Bibliography
Phyllis Grosskurth, John Addington Symons, a Biography, 1964
Owain W. Jones, Glyn Simon, His Life and Opinions, 1981
Portrait of the geologist William Daniel Conybeare (1787-1857): Gathering the Jewels

Llandaff